Radio stations located at 93.0 FM (93.0MHz on the FM dial) include:

 Radio stations in Australia; see List of radio stations in Australia
 Radio Studio M, Doboj, Bosnia
 N-JOY, Velingrad, Bulgaria
 Several radio stations for Radio Okapi in the Congo
 Dubai 93.0 FM; see Radio and television channels of Dubai
 Kiss FM (Finland), Kuopio, Finland
 TSF Jazz, Paris, France; formerly 93.0 MHz
 Several radio stations in Greece; see List of radio stations in Greece
 Kol Chai, Bnei Brak, Israel
 CRI Vientiane, Vientiane, Laos; China Radio International
 Several radio stations in Japan; see List of radio stations in Japan
 JOLF, Tokyo, Kanto, Japan; on the Nippon Broadcasting System
 Hitz (radio station), Malacca & Northern Johor, Malaysia
 Gorkha FM, Kathmandu, Nepal; see List of FM radio stations in Nepal
 Several radio stations in the Netherlands; see List of radio stations in the Netherlands
 Radio 10 (Netherlands), Westdorpe, Netherlands
 The Edge (radio station) (FM 93.0 MHz in Manawatu, Palmerston North, New Zealand)
 Radio Bay of Plenty (FM 93.0 MHz in Ōhope, North Island, New Zealand)
 GB93, Skardu, Gilgit-Baltistan, Pakistan; see List of radio channels in Pakistan
 M80 Radio (FM 93.0 MHz in Leiria, Portugal)
 Radio Kniga 93.0 FM, Chelyabinsk, Russia; see List of Russian-language radio stations
 Believer's Broadcasting Network, Freetown, Sierra Leone; see Mass media in Sierra Leone
 Metro FM, South Africa; see List of radio stations in South Africa
 Lentswe Community Radio, Free State, South Africa
 Gold FM (Sri Lanka) (FM 93.0 MHz in Colombo)
 Several radio stations in Turkey; see List of radio stations in Turkey
 BBC Radio 4, Berwick-upon-Tweed, UK; see Berwick-upon-Tweed television relay station
 Revival FM, Glasgow, UK; see List of radio stations in the United Kingdom

See also
 93 FM (stations identifying as 93 on the FM dial, but may be located elsewhere other than 93.0 MHz)

Lists of radio stations by frequency